Daniel Abraham Hughes (c.1819 – 27 May 1879) was a banker, barrister and politician in colonial Victoria, a member of the Victorian Legislative Assembly.

Hughes was the son of W. Hughes who owned Hughes' Wharf, Melbourne. Daniel Hughes was a bank clerk in Ireland, then a clerk in the London office of P&O.
 
In November 1856, Hughes was elected to the Victorian Legislative Assembly for Portland, a position he held until August 1859.

Hughes died in Mollison street, Sandhurst (later renamed Bendigo).

References

 

1819 births
1879 deaths
Members of the Victorian Legislative Assembly
19th-century Australian politicians